First Presbyterian Church of Maumee Chapel (also known as First Presbyterian Church of Maumee) is a historic church at 200 E. Broadway in Maumee, Ohio. It is the oldest church building in Northwest Ohio.

The Greek Revival church building was constructed in 1837 and added to the National Register of Historic Places in 1973.

References

External links
Church website

Presbyterian churches in Ohio
Churches on the National Register of Historic Places in Ohio
Greek Revival church buildings in Ohio
Churches completed in 1837
Churches in Lucas County, Ohio
National Register of Historic Places in Lucas County, Ohio